Whitehill Welfare Football Club is a football club based in the village of Rosewell, Midlothian, Scotland. They are members of the East of Scotland Football League and play their home matches at Ferguson Park. The club was founded in 1953 and initially competed in juvenile football before turning senior and joining the East of Scotland Football League in 1979. They are the most successful side in East of Scotland League history, winning a total of 16 titles prior to joining the Lowland League as one of its founder members in 2013.

History
The earliest records of Whitehill Welfare indicate that the team first appeared in the 1905–06 season under the name Rosewell Rosedale, replacing the defunct Rosedale Rovers, and playing in the Midlothian Juvenile League. The highlight of this team's existence, it appears, was to reach the Scottish Juvenile Cup Final, and an incident in August 1939 where the police investigated an attack on the Rosewell goalkeeper, accused of letting the side down during a 10–2 defeat.

Although Rosedale continued operating until 1957, it was in 1953 that Whitehill Welfare were formed, the founding fathers being a group of employees from the now defunct Whitehill Colliery. In the early years, Whitehill were the chopping block for the more fancied clubs. Although reaching the Scottish Juvenile Cup semi-final in 1959, they did not really come to the fore until 1964, when they won every trophy in the Mid and East Lothian Section Juvenile League.

By 1979, there were only six Juvenile clubs left in Whitehill's league, and so the Welfare decided it was time to go senior. This resulted in the team joining the East of Scotland Football League in August 1979, a league which they were to top at the end of their first four seasons. Membership of the Scottish Football Association also has the advantage of allowing the club to compete in the Scottish Cup. In this competition, Whitehill Welfare have knocked out Albion Rovers (1986–87), earned replays against three Scottish Football League sides and, led by player/manager Dave Smith, played Celtic in the 1995-96 tournament. The game saw Whitehill Welfare hold Celtic to 0–0 until the 39th minute before ending in a 3–0 defeat. In 1999, Whitehill were stopped short from advancing to the third round of the Scottish Cup, when it lost against Stenhousemuir, 2–0.

The 2012–13 season saw the return of Mike Lawson, who guided the team to the SFA South Region Challenge Cup and completed the double by winning an unprecedented 16th East of Scotland League title before leaving for Spartans, taking 13 players along with him. Their most successful manager, Dave Smith, returned to build a new team and led this team to  another league title and Scottish Qualifying Cup double. The club joined the Lowland Football League in 2013 but were relegated back to the East of Scotland league in 2019 (their place taken by Bonnyrigg Rose, a team based just two miles from Rosewell which had only moved to the senior setup from the Junior ranks a year earlier).

Former club captain Andrew Kidd was appointed as manager on 15 November 2020.

Current squad
As of 28 May 2021

Coaching staff
Manager: Jack Lynch
Coaches: Mark Smith, Michael Osbourne, Lee McIntosh
Physiotherapist: Francis Fleming

Honours
Senior football
East of Scotland Football League
1979–80, 1980–81, 1981–82, 1982–83, 1984–85, 1985–86, 1987–88, 1992–93, 1993–94, 1994–95, 1995–96, 1997–98, 1998–99, 2002–03, 2007–08, 2012–13
Scottish Qualifying Cup (South)
1980–81, 1986–87, 1993–94, 1994–95, 1995–96, 1997–98, 1998–99, 1999–00, 2000–01, 2002–03, 2004–05
SFA South Region Challenge Cup
2012–13, 2015–16
East of Scotland Qualifying Cup
1980–81, 1984–85, 1985–86, 1991–92, 1993–94, 1998–99, 1999–00, 2000–01, 2008–09, 2013–14
East of Scotland 'City' Cup
1993–94, 1998–99, 1999–00, 2013–14
King Cup
1982–83, 1992–93, 1993–94, 1994–95, 1995–96, 1997–98
East of Scotland League Cup
1987–88, 1998–89, 1990–91, 1991–92, 1994–95, 1995–96, 1996–97, 1997–98, 1998–99, 2002–03, 2006–07, 2007–2008, 2011–12

Juvenile football
Scottish Juvenile Cup
1969–70, 1970–71, 1974–75, 1977–78
East of Scotland Juvenile Cup
1969–70, 1970–71, 1974–75, 1977–78
Walker Cup
1964–65, 1969–70, 1971–72, 1972–73, 1973–74, 1974–75
Porter Cup
1964–65, 1969–70, 1971–72, 1972–73, 1974–75, 1977–78
Di Rollo Cup
1964–65, 1965–66, 1966–67, 1970–71, 1971–72, 1972–73, 1973–74, 1974–75
Howard Cup
1964–65, 1968–69, 1969–70, 1970–71, 1972–73, 1974–75
Hunter Cup
1974–75, 1975–76
W. Bauld Cup
1974–75, 1977–78
Midlothian Juvenile League Championship
1965, 1968, 1970, 1971, 1975, 1977
Midlothian Juvenile League Cup
1967–68, 1969–70 (joint winners)

References

External links
 Club website

Football clubs in Scotland
Football in Midlothian
Association football clubs established in 1953
1953 establishments in Scotland
East of Scotland Football League teams
Lowland Football League teams
Mining association football teams in Scotland